Bakka is a tiny village in Aurland Municipality in Vestland county, Norway. The village is home to the Bakka Church. In 2000, the  Bakka Tunnel was constructed on the road from Gudvangen to Bakka to make the journey quicker and safer.

Name
The name Bakka is derived from the Old Norse word bakki which means "(river) bank". The -a ending is the dative case ending used with prepositions to show location: "on the bank". In the 19th century, it was common to spell the name Bakke.

Media gallery

References

Villages in Vestland
Aurland